Folu Erinle (born 29 January 1940) is a Nigerian former hurdler who competed in the 1964 Summer Olympics.

References

1940 births
Living people
Yoruba sportspeople
Nigerian male hurdlers
Olympic athletes of Nigeria
Athletes (track and field) at the 1964 Summer Olympics
Commonwealth Games competitors for Nigeria
Athletes (track and field) at the 1966 British Empire and Commonwealth Games
African Games gold medalists for Nigeria
African Games medalists in athletics (track and field)
Athletes (track and field) at the 1965 All-Africa Games
20th-century Nigerian people
21st-century Nigerian people